Jasper is a masculine given name commonly believed to be of Persian origin, meaning "treasurer". The etymology of the given name Jasper (of Persian origin) is believed to be unrelated to that of the gemstone jasper (of Semitic origin).

Jasper may refer to:

People

Arts
 Jasper van den Bos (1634-1656), Dutch marine painter
 Jasper Broers (1682–1716), Flemish painter
 Jasper Conran (born 1959), British fashion designer
 Jasper Francis Cropsey (1823-1900), American landscape painter
 Jasper Geeraards (c. 1620-between 1649 and 1654), Flemish painter
 Jasper Johns (born 1930), American painter, sculptor and printmaker
 Jasper Morrison (born 1959), British product and furniture designer
 Jasper Proude, a pseudonym of Brian Howard (poet) (1905-1958)

Entertainment
 Jasper Carrott (born 1945), British comedian
 Jasper Duncombe, 7th Baron Feversham (born 1968), British adult film director
 Jasper Fforde (born 1961), British novelist
 Jasper Fisher, English divine and dramatist
 Jasper van 't Hof (born 1947), Dutch jazz pianist and keyboard player
 Jasper Liu (born 1986), Taiwanese actor, model and musician
 Jasper Maskelyne (1902-1973), British stage magician
 Jasper Pääkkönen (born 1980), Finnish actor
 Jasper Redd (born 1979), American comedian
 Jasper Steverlinck (born 1976), Belgian Flemish pop rock singer and guitarist
 Jasper (actor) (born 1972), Tamil actor

Politics
 Jasper Ewing Brady (1797-1871), American politician
 Jasper Culpeper (by 1508-1556/1564), English politician and Member of Parliament
 Jasper McLevy (1878-1962), American mayor
 Jasper More (1907-1987), British politician
 Jasper K. Smith (1905-1992), American politician
 Jasper Tsang (born 1947), Hong Kong politician
 Jasper Wolfe (1872-1952), Irish politician

Religion
 Jasper Heywood (1535-1598), British theologian
 Jasper Mayne (1604-1672), English clergyman
 Jasper Wilson (politician) (1819-1896), American Baptist preacher and politician

Sports
 Jacobus Jasper Cillessen (born 1989), Dutch football goalkeeper
 Jasper Collins (born 1991), Canadian Football League player
 Jasper Harvey (born 1983), American former football player
 Jasper Lindsten (born 1994), Finnish ice hockey player
 Jasper Pittard (born 1991), Australian rules footballer
 Jasper Stuyven (born 1992), Belgian racing cyclist
 Jasper Vinall (c. 1590-1624), English cricketer, first cricketer known to have died from an accident during a game
 Jasper Wilson (basketball) (born 1947), former American Basketball Association player

Other
 Jasper Tudor, Duke of Bedford (1431-1495), uncle of King Henry VII
 Jasper Adams (1793-1841), American clergyman, college professor and college president
 Jasper Becker (born 1956), British author, commentator and journalist
 Jasper Blaxland (1880–1963), English consultant surgeon
 Jasper Danckaerts, 17th century journal writer and founder of an unsuccessful colony in what is now Maryland
 Jasper Jack Daniel (1849-1911), American distiller and founder of Jack Daniel's Tennessee whiskey distillery
 Jasper Griffin (1937–2019), British literary academic
 Jasper Grosvenor (1794-1857), American financier
 Jasper Kirkby, British experimental particle physicist
 Jasper A. Maltby (1826-1867), American Civil War general
 Jasper Morris (born 1957), Master of Wine, and Burgundy expert
 Jasper Nicolls (1778-1849), British Army officer and commander-in-chief, India
 Jasper O'Farrell (1817-1875), American surveyor
 Jasper Ridley (1920-2004), British writer and historical biographer
 Jasper Nicholas Ridley (1887-1951), British barrister and banker
 Jasper Rine (born 1953), American biologist
 Jasper Seagar (died 1721), a pirate active in the Indian Ocean
 Jasper White (chef) (born 1954), American chef, restaurateur and cookbook author
 Jasper Yeates (1745–1817), lawyer and Pennsylvania Supreme Court judge

Fictional characters
 Jasper Dale, character on Canadian Series Road to Avonlea
 Jasper, original name of Tom Cat from MGM's Tom and Jerry cartoons
 Jasper Beardley, a recurring character from the animated TV series The Simpsons
 Jasper Hale, of the Cullen family in Stephenie Meyer's Twilight series
 Jasper Jacks, in the American soap opera General Hospital
 the title character of the 2009 novel Jasper Jones and Jasper Jones (film)
 Jasper Sitwell, a Marvel Comics spy
 Jasper (Dr. Stone), a character in the manga series Dr. Stone
 Jasper (Family Guy), a dog and Brian's cousin in the animated TV series Family Guy
 Jasper the Bear, a Canadian cartoon character
 Jasper, one of the biblical magi who were said to have visited the infant Jesus bearing gifts of gold, frankincense and myrrh
 Jasper, one of Cruella de Vil's henchmen in Disney's 101 Dalmatians
 Jasper, a carriage driver from Dr. Jekyll and Mr. Hyde 
 Jasper, a butler from Heaven Can Wait 
 Jasper, a controversial black puppet character in George Pal's 1930s–1940s short film series Jasper and the Beanstalk
 Jasper, a villain on the Cartoon Network show Steven Universe
 Jasper Dunlop, a recurring character from the Nickelodeon show Henry Danger
 Jasper Batt, Jr., the main antagonist of the video game No More Heroes 2: Desperate Struggle
 Jasper T. Jowls, a member of Chuck E. Cheese's animatronic band
 Jasper, a ghost of a child who haunts Spooky Island from Rooster Teeth's web series Camp Camp
 Jasper Jordan, one of the original 100 juvenile prisoners from the TV series The 100
 Jasper Tempest, the full name of Professor T.
 Rock guitarist Jasper de Zoet, a principal character in David Mitchell's novel Utopia Avenue
 Jasper Lamar Crabb, a character spoken of – but not seen – in the 1974 neo-noir film Chinatown, and whose name becomes a pivotal clue in solving a mystery

See also
 Jesper

References

English masculine given names
Dutch masculine given names
Given names derived from gemstones